The 2007–08 Scottish Youth Cup was the 25th season of the competition. The holders Rangers defeated Celtic in the final.

Calendar

First round

Second round

Third round

Fourth round

Quarter-finals

Semi-finals

Final

References
 SFA – Scottish Youth Cup archive

Youth cup
2007